The Negros shrew (Crocidura negrina) is a white-toothed shrew found only on the island of Negros in the Philippines. It is locally called the katsurí and is listed as an endangered species due to habitat loss and a restricted range.

References

Crocidura
Mammals of the Philippines
Endemic fauna of the Philippines
Fauna of Negros Island
Mammals described in 1952